John Fitzalan or John FitzAlan may refer to:

John Fitzalan (died 1240) (1200–1240), Lord of Oswestry
John Fitzalan, 6th Earl of Arundel (1385–1421), Lord of Oswestry and Clun, Breton-English nobleman
John Fitzalan, 7th Earl of Arundel (1408–1435), English nobleman
John FitzAlan, 1st Baron Arundel (c. 1348–1379), Marshal of England
John FitzAlan, 2nd Baron Arundel (1364–1390)
John Fitzalan (1246–1272), Lord of Arundel
John Fitzalan (1223–1267), Lord of Oswestry, Clun, and Arundel